Keimyung University (계명대학교, Gyemyeong Daehakgyo), abbreviated as KMU or Keimyung (啓明), is a private university located in Daegu, the fourth largest city in South Korea. The university takes roots from Jejungwon founded in 1899. The higher education started in 1954 with the support of the leaders of the Northern Presbyterian Church of the U.S. as a Christian university. KMU is composed of three campuses in the city of Daegu, South Korea. They are named for their locations within the city; Daemyeong, which is near the downtown area, Seongseo, which is in the western part of the city, and also Dongsan campus which includes Dongsan Medical Center. The university's Seongseo campus is known as one of the most beautiful campuses in South Korea.

Keimyung University has relationships with more than 400 research and educational organizations worldwide as well as one of the largest communities of international professors in South Korea.

History
Keimyung University originated from Keimyung Christian College, which was founded in 1954, by Reverend Edward Adams, an American missionary of the Northern Presbyterian Church of the U.S., and by Reverends Choi Jaehwa and Kang Ingu, two local Presbyterian Church leaders. The founding principle guiding their concerted efforts was to provide Koreans with higher education firmly anchored in Christianity. 1978, the year of Keimyung's elevation to the status of a university, marked the beginning of a new period of rapid development. In October 1980, the university merged with the Dongsan Presbyterian Hospital, a prestigious local hospital with 81-year history of service, and re-opened it as Keimyung University Medical Center. The development of Keimyung acquired a new dimension in the early 1980s when it added a new campus built on 550,000 pyeong (181,500 sq. meters) at Seongseo in Sindang-dong, Dalseo-gu, to its existing Daemyeong and Dongsan campuses.

Academics

Undergraduate colleges
College of Humanities and International Studies
College of Education
College of Business Administration
College of Social Sciences
Keimyung Adams College
College of Natural Sciences
College of Pharmacy
College of Engineering
College of Medicine
College of Nursing
Tabula Rasa College
College of Music and Performing Arts
College of Physical Education
College of Fine Arts
Artech College

Other programmes
Korean Language Programme
Korean Cultural Experience Programme
Cross Cultural Awareness Programme
Evening Programmes

Graduate schools
Graduate School of Humanities and Social Sciences
Graduate School of Natural Sciences
Graduate School of Engineering
Graduate School of Arts and Physical Education Science
Graduate School of Medical Sciences
Graduate School of Education
Graduate School of Business
Graduate School of Policy Studies
United Graduate School of Theology
United Graduate School of Arts
Graduate School of Sport Industry
Graduate School of Early Childhood Education
Graduate School of Convergence Engineering

University Periodicals
Acta Koreana, a peer-reviewed international journal of Korean Studies published in English by Academia Koreana. It is indexed in Thomson Reuters Arts and Humanities Citation Index (A&HCI), Elsevier's Scopus, EBSCO and Korea Citation Index (KCI).
 Acta Via Serica, an international, multi-disciplinary, open-access journal published in English semi-annually. The journal is devoted to publishing new research within the arts, humanities, and social sciences concerning the Silk Road region and Central Asia.
 Keimyung Medical Journal, a biannual journal published by the School of Medicine. It publishes articles in all medical fields, including clinical research, basic medicine and nursing.
 Keimyung Gazette

Facilities

Dormitory

Dongsan Library

The Dongsan Library, originally known as the Library of Keimyung Christian College, was established in July 1958. It was moved to its current site at the Seongseo Campus in March 1993 to facilitate expansion into a much larger facility that meets the needs of the information age. The Dongsan Library comprises three separate libraries: the main Dongsan Library at Seongseo Campus (seven stories above and two below ground level, with a total floor space of 6,538 pyeong), the second Dongsan Library at the Daemyung Dong Campus (seven stories above and two below ground level, with a total floor space of 5,392 pyeong) and the Medical Library at Dongsan Medical Center. Equipped with multi-media functions and an advanced information retrieval network, the Dongsan Library is now the focal point for research activities of faculty members as well as students. At present, the Dongsan Library houses around one and a half- million books, including specialized reference books, scientific journals, theses, ancient documents, micro-data, CD-ROMs and multi-media materials. The information or data owned by the Dongsan Library is made available for users around the world through the Keimyung University Library Integrated Information Management System (KIMS).

Dongsan Medical Center
Keimyung University Medical Center consists of a medical school, Dongsan hospital, and Gyeongju Dongsan hospital. The History of Dongsan Medical Center dates back to 1899 when Dr. Woodbridge O. Johnson, an American Missionary dispatched by the Korean Mission of the Northern Presbyterian Church of the United States, started the Salvation Hospital and became the founder of the medical center. It was the beginning of the first medical activity in Daegu. Dongsan Medical Center merged with Keimyung University in 1978 to establish a Medical School and at present it has 1,000 bed capacity with 1,700 employees. Entering upon the 21st century, Dongsan Medical Center will spare no effort to move Medical School, Nursing College, Second Dongsan Hospital and Medical Science and Research Building to Keimyung University Sungsuh Campus.

Hengso Museum

Since it was established on May 20, 1978, the Museum has devoted its efforts to studying the historical and cultural heritage of the local region with a special focus on Kaya, an ancient civilization that once flourished in Korea, but which left few records. Since then, the museum has accomplished much, including the excavation of the royal tombs of the Kaya Dynasty.Many Kaya artifacts uncovered through those efforts are on display in the Museum. Currently, a plan is under way to construct a new museum on a 9,900 square-meter site with a total floor space of 5,940 square meters. The opening is scheduled for May 2004, which will also mark the 50th anniversary of the university. The new museum building will feature a university history gallery, Korean history gallery, curatorial department, a conservation science laboratory, and other accommodations including a museum shop and a café.

Edward Adams Hall of Worship and Praise (Adams Chapel)

Located high on the flank of Kungsan Hill above the Seongseo Campus of Keimyung University, the Edward Adams Hall of Worship and Praise (known as the Adams Chapel) was built to honor the achievements of missionary Edward Adams, one of the founders of Keimyung University. The Adams Hall of Worship and Praise has three towers on the facade and a central domed tower. Those three towers in front (the two to the right of the center and one to the left) represent Keimyung University's educational precept, "truth", "justice", and "love", and the central dome represents "the Kingdom of God". The seven round columns in the main chapel represent the 7 early churches in Asia referred to in the Book of Revelation in the New Testament. In the main chapel there is a beautiful pipe organ built by the Karl Schuke company of Germany. On the front of the organ are three crowns, underneath each of which are arranged seven pipes. These represent the Holy Trinity, as well as the seven angels with seven trumpets as recorded in the Book of Revelation. In addition, the Adams Chapel has over 160 stained glass windows of various sizes. The stained glass window depict the twelve disciples of Christ, the three Wise Men, the Ten Commandments, the judgement of Solomon and other stories from the Bible. The pipe organ, the stained glass, the chapel chairs, and the marble of the columns of the Adams Chapel were all made through the generous donation from the friendly Keimyung University.

International Lounge
The Keimyung University International Lounge is a self-access learning centre. The space opened in March 2005. In 2018, the space was expanded and re-modeled to cater for a greater number of visitors.

Colleges

Keimyung Adams College

Keimyung Adams College is an honors college within Keimyung University.  All of its courses are taught in English according to North American and European standards and norms. Most of Keimyung Adams' professors come from North America and Europe as well.  Its student enrollment includes both Korean national students and international students.  It offers three bachelor's degrees in International Business, International Relations.  Because Keimyung Adams' curriculum is based on North American and European norms, it is a popular school for exchange students.  Keimyung Adams also supports international students seeking a dual-degree from abroad; this program requires a four-semester residency.  Requirements for graduation from each of Keimyung Adams' degree programs require a senior thesis, an international internship, and accomplishment in Korean, English, and either Japanese or Mandarin languages.

College of Music and Performing Arts
Keimyung has offered programs in music since the 1960s and the College traces its lineage to the Department of Religious Music. Over time, course offerings were expanded to include theater, music production and dance. The college is divided into two faculties: Faculty of Music and Faculty of Performing Arts.

Keimyung-Chopin Music Academy
In 1999, Keimyung started an English-medium dual-degree program in partnership with Chopin University of Music in Warsaw, Poland. There are at least twelve professors from the Polish institution on site at Keimyung teaching the course. The professors select 30 students every year from among the prospective candidates through a process of highly competitive auditions and in-depth interviews. The cross-institution partnership has been reaffirmed by Polish leaders visiting South Korea, taking the time to travel to Daegu from Seoul. 

Keimyung is the host site of the Asia Pacific International Chopin Piano Competition. It is supported by the Polish Embassy in South Korea.

College of Engineering

The six buildings used by the College of Engineering are located in the northeast of the Seongseo Campus. There are 25 multimedia classrooms in these buildings as well as 22 computer laboratories and 140 rooms for experimentation. Professors from Germany, Indonesia, Ghana, Ethiopia, USA, China, Mexico, Russia, Canada and New Zealand work in various departments of the college.

Departments
 Department of Advanced Materials Engineering
 Department of Architecture
 Department of Architectural Engineering
 Department of Automotive System Engineering
 Department of Chemical Engineering
 Department of Civil Engineering
 Department of Computer Engineering
 Department of Electronic Engineering
 Department of Electrical Energy Engineering
 Department of Game and Mobile Engineering
 Department of Industrial Engineering
 Department of Landscape Architecture
 Department of Mechanical Engineering
 Department of Robot Engineering
 Department of Transportation Engineering
 Department of Urban Planning

College of Education
The College of Education offers both academic and practical programs designed to train future secondary school teachers who can enhance the knowledge and ability of younger generations. All graduates receive a second level teachers certificate on graduation in their major.

Departments
 Department of Education
 Department of Sino-Korean Literature Education
 Department of Early Childhood Education
 Department of English Education
 Department of Korean Language Education

Tabula Rasa College

The aim of the College of Liberal Arts is for students to study a wide range of liberal courses, foster foreign language ability necessary in this modern era of internationalization and computer capability needed in the information age. The college also strives to cultivate a positive attitude and character for study. It runs Liberal Seminar and Academic Writing, Keimyung Spirit and Service, Understanding of Christianity, Communication English, Academic English, and Plan for Campus Life as mandatory liberal courses and subjects taken from the foreign language track and the information track, both general course subjects and electives offered on these tracks.

College of Physical education

The College of Physical Education aims at nurturing international professionals in physical activity with a synthesis of knowledge, virtue, and physical ability. At present, over 650 undergraduate students and 150 graduate students are studying at the college, pursuing their career and scholastic goals. There are 18 faculty members and 14 student assistants in the college, providing students with the opportunity to develop their potentials and obtain theoretical knowledge and practical experiences related to all areas of physical education. The college owns facilities for both educational research and physical education including the Korean Taekwondo Center, the Center for Exercise Pedagogy, a sports science laboratory, a computer laboratory, a gymnasium, a weight training center, and an athletics track as well as a variety of sports clubs for students.

Keimyung is a member of the Korea University Sports Federation (KUSF). Eligible students are afforded the opportunity to participate in inter-varsity national competitions.

Departments
 Department of Physical Education
 Department of Taekwondo
 Department of Sport Marketing

College of Social Sciences
College of Social Sciences was established in 1980. It currently hosts fourteen majors with students body over 4,000.

Departments
 Department of Economics and Commerce
 Department of Public Service
 Department of Communication
 Department of Consumer Consumer Information Studies
 Department of Sociology
 Department of Psychology
 Department of Library and Information Science
 Department of Social Welfare
 Department of Law
 Department of Police Administration

Courses in English
 Keimyung Adams College: Keimyung has an all-English program at Keimyung Adams College for undergraduate degrees in International Business, International Relations, and Information Technology. Coursework also includes classes in History, Economics, and International Law.
 Korean Tradition: Korean Language, Korean History, Introduction to Korean Culture, Korean Religion and Thought, Introduction to Korean Zen Buddhism, Korean Literature in English
 Politics & Economics: Fundamentals of Economics, Micro and Macro Economics, Comparative Politics in East Asia, Korean Economy, Global E-business in East Asia
Society & Culture: Cross-Cultural Communication, Mass Media & Popular Culture in Korea, Oriental Thought & Counseling
Library & Information Science: Text Processing, Web Programming, Information Communication Technology, Database Design
Arts: Taekwondo, Korean Dance, Oriental Painting, Korean Ceramics, Korean Traditional Music
 College of Law and Police Sciences:  Legal English, Introduction to American Law, Intellectual Property, International Trade Law, American Criminal Law and Justice, American Police Law, Crime Prevention, Criminal Justice Theory & Policy, International Criminal Law, White Collar Crime
 College of Engineering: more than 100 courses are taught in English
Other Programs and Courses: Many departments at Keimyung have courses for English proficiency in reading, writing, and conversation.

The list of all courses offered in English is available at the university webpage.

People

Alumni

 Chang Hye-jin, a South Korean recurve archer. A two-time Olympic gold medalist, Chang was the Olympic champion in both the women's individual and women's team events at 2016 Summer Olympics in Rio de Janeiro. She is a former number one-ranked recurve archer, having headed the World Archery Rankings between 2017 and 2019.
 Min Hyo-rin, a South Korean actress, model and singer.
 Kang Min-ho better known by the stage name E Sens, is a South Korean rapper.
 Kim Jae-yup, a retired South Korean judoka. Olympic gold medalist (1988).
 Park Jinsoo, a Professor in the Business School, Seoul National University.
 Choi Tae Hyun, an Associate Professor in the College of Medicine, Seoul National University.
 Kwon Oh-Yun, a Professor in the Department of Physical Therapy, Yonsei University, Seoul.

Former Faculty Members

 Hoesung Lee, a South Korean economist and current chair of the Intergovernmental Panel on Climate Change of the United Nations.
 Sem Vermeersch, an Associate Professor in the School of Humanities, Seoul National University.
 Kevin Kester, an Associate Professor in the Department of Education, Seoul National University.

Current Professors

 Sergey Tarasov, Russian pianist. He was awarded 2nd prizes at the 1995 Ferruccio Busoni and Arthur Rubinstein competitions before winning the 1996 Sydney International Piano Competition. In 1988 he also won the 7th Prague Spring International Piano Competition. He subsequently obtained the 1998 International Tchaikovsky Competition's 4th prize, and won the 1999 Premio Jaén.

Editors of Indexed Journals

As of 2021, the following professors and staff of Keimyung University serve as editorial board members in prestigious academic journals published by Springer, Elsevier, MDPI, Taylor & Francis, SAGE, and South Korean academic societies.

 Byeong-Churl Jang, Biomolecules, MDPI
 Chang-Seop Lee, Fibers, MDPI
 Chang-Wook Nam, Korean Circulation Journal, South Korea
 Chul-Ho Jeong, Archives of Pharmacal Research, Springer
 Dong-Geun Oh, Journal of Information Science Theory and Practice, Korea Institute of Science and Technology Information, South Korea
 Eunah Yoh, Fashion and Textiles, SpringerOpen
 Eungi Kim, Journal of Information Science Theory and Practice, Korea Institute of Science and Technology Information, South Korea
 Hee-Jung Yeo, The Asian Journal of Shipping and Logistics, Elsevier
 Hye Soon Kim, Diabetes & Metabolism Journal, Korean Diabetes Association, South Korea
 Hye Young Kim, Asian Nursing Research, Elsevier
 Jong Hwa Jun, BMC Ophthalmology, BMC (Springer Nature)
 Jung-Hee Jang, Archives of Pharmacal Research, Springer
 Jung-Soo Seo, The Asian Journal of Shipping and Logistics, Elsevier
 Jung Woo Bae, Archives of Pharmacal Research, Springer
 Jungho Park, International Review of Public Administration, Taylor & Francis
 Ki-Dong Lee, Asia-Pacific Journal of Regional Science, Springer
 Kyung-Soo Chun, Archives of Pharmacal Research, Springer; Cells, MDPI
 Madhu Atteraya, BMC Women's Health, BMC (Springer Nature); Research on Social Work Practice, SAGE
 Min-Woo Lee, Applied Sciences, MDPI
 Mohsen Joshanloo, The International Journal of Wellbeing, New Zealand
 Rushan Ziatdinov, European Journal of Contemporary Education, Russia & Slovakia; Informatica, Slovenian Society Informatika, Slovenia; Journal of Research on Technology in Education, Taylor & Francis; Maejo International Journal of Science and Technology, Thailand
 Sang-hun Lee, Geosystem Engineering, Taylor & Francis
 Se Youp Lee, Journal of the Korean Ophthalmological Society, South Korea
 Seung-Soon Im, Biomedicines, MDPI; Journal of Ginseng Research, Elsevier
 Seungmok Lee, Actuators, MDPI
 Sooyeun Lee, Journal of Analytical Science and Technology, SpringerOpen
 Yeong-seok Ha, The Asian Journal of Shipping and Logistics, Elsevier
 Yun Seok Heo, JMST Advances, Springer

External links

 Keimyung University 
 Keimyung University 
 Keimyung University International Lounge
 Keimyung Adams College
 Graduate School of Business
 Keimyung Art Center
 Keimyung College University 
 Keimyung Gazette

See also
 History of Korea
 Education in South Korea
 List of colleges and universities in South Korea
 Korean Language
 Daegu
 North Gyeongsang Province

References

 
Association of Christian Universities and Colleges in Asia
1954 establishments in South Korea
Educational institutions established in 1954